The Railway Museum is a museum located in the Savski Venac, Belgrade, the capital of Serbia.

History
It was founded on 1 February 1950. The first exhibition was held in 1953 under title "Through the history of Yugoslav Railways". Museum is in possession of over 40,000 objects and also has an archive and library. It also operates the Šargan Eight narrow gauge heritage railway, running from the village of Mokra Gora to Šargan Vitasi station. As of 2018, it is managed by the company Serbian Railways.

Gallery

References

External links

 Railway Museum at zeleznicesrbije.com
 Railway Museum at serbia.com

Museums in Belgrade
Serbian Railways
Museums established in 1950
Railway museums in Serbia
1950 establishments in Yugoslavia
Savski Venac